was a village located in Kuji District, Ibaraki Prefecture, Japan.

As of 2003, the village had an estimated population of 6,011 and a density of 74.28 persons per km2. The total area was 80.92 km2.

On December 1, 2004, Suifu, along with the town of Kanasagō, and the village of Satomi (all from Kuji District), was merged into the expanded city of Hitachiōta and no longer exists as an independent municipality.

External links
 Official website of Hitachiōta in Japanese

Dissolved municipalities of Ibaraki Prefecture